Tropiocolotes naybandensis is a species of gecko of the genus Tropiocolotes. It is found in the Bushehr Province, Iran. The specific epithet naybandensis relates to the type locality, which is near the Nayband Gulf.

References

naybandensis
Reptiles described in 2013
Reptiles of Iran
Endemic fauna of Iran